Vrioon is the debut collaboration album between Ryuichi Sakamoto and Alva Noto, released in 2002. This is the first album in the Virus Series followed by four other records: Insen (2005), Revep (2006), utp_ (2008), and Summvs (2011). The initial letters of the five albums together form the word "Virus".

Overview
A minimalist album, it is characterized by an unusual experimental sound driven by piano and distorted, clipped samples (a sound which Sakamoto and Noto would also experiment with in Insen in 2005). The album was elected among the first 50 albums of 2003 by magazine The Wire. It was also named album of the year in 2004 by The Wire magazine.

Reception

—Ben Tausig, Dusted Magazine

Track listing
 "Uoon I" 13:51 
 "Uoon II" 9:40 
 "Duoon" 5:46
 "Noon" 10:13
 "Trioon I" 5:09
 "Trioon II" 9:57

Personnel
 Ryuichi Sakamoto – piano
 Alva Noto – electronics
 Carsten Nicolai – Additional Sounds

References

External links
 Dusted Magazine review by Ben Tausig
 Review by Textura
 Review by Squid's Ear

2002 albums
Ryuichi Sakamoto albums
Alva Noto albums
Collaborative albums
Raster-Noton albums